Christian Möller (born in Ludwigshafen am Rhein, Germany in 1963) is a German artist and painter.  He studied at the Academy of fine arts (Staatliche Akademie der Bildenden Künste) in Karlsruhe by Horst Antes from 1986 to 1992.

External links
http://www.christianmoeller.eu
http://christianmoeller.bildkunstnet.de
http://www.christianmoeller.artistportfolio.net
http://www.myartspace.com/artistInfo.do?populatinglist=home&subscriberid=x8bncwq3l9vz71k1
http://the-artists.org/artist/Christian-Philipp-Mueller
http://www.kunstheute.de

1963 births
Living people
People from Ludwigshafen
20th-century German painters
20th-century German male artists
German male painters
21st-century German painters
21st-century German male artists